Stevensite is white clay mineral. The mineral is a member of smectite.

The mineral is named after Edwin Augustus Stevens.

Stevensite can be found Dean Quarry.

References

Smectite group